The 1974 European Weightlifting Championships were held in Verona, Italy from May 27 to June 6, 1974. This was the 53rd edition of the event. There were 162 men in action from 26 nations.

Medal summary
{| 
|-
!colspan=7|52 kg
|-
|Snatch
||| 100.0 kg
||| 97.5 kg
||| 97.5 kg
|-
|Clean & Jerk
||| 132.5 kg
||| 130.0 kg
||| 127.5 kg
|-bgcolor=#dfefff
|Total
||| 230.0 kg||| 227.5 kg
||| 227.5 kg|-
!colspan=7|56 kg
|-
|Snatch
||| 110.0 kg
||| 110.0 kg
||| 107.5 kg
|-
|Clean & Jerk
||| 147.5 kg
||| 140.0 kg
||| 137.5 kg
|-bgcolor=#dfefff
|Total||| 257.5 kg
||| 247.5 kg||| 245.0 kg
|-
!colspan=7|60 kg
|-
|Snatch
||| 120.0 kg
||| 120.0 kg
||| 120.0 kg
|-
|Clean & Jerk
||| 152.5 kg
||| 152.5 kg
||| 150.0 kg
|-bgcolor=#dfefff
|Total
||| 272.5 kg||| 272.5 kg
||| 265.0 kg|-
!colspan=7|67.5 kg
|-
|Snatch
||| 132.5 kg
||| 127.5 kg
||| 125.0 kg
|-
|Clean & Jerk
||| 172.5 kg
||| 165.0 kg
||| 160.0 kg
|-bgcolor=#dfefff
|Total||| 300.0 kg
||| 297.5 kg||| 280.0 kg
|-
!colspan=7|75 kg
|-
|Snatch
||| 152.5 kg
||| 145.0 kg
||| 142.5 kg
|-
|Clean & Jerk
||| 187.5 kg
||| 185.0 kg
||| 182.5 kg 
|-bgcolor=#dfefff
|Total
| || 340.0 kg||| 327.5 kg
||| 325.0 kg|-
!colspan=7|82.5 kg
|-
|Snatch
||| 160.0 kg
||| 157.5 kg
||| 152.5 kg
|-
|Clean & Jerk
||| 197.5 kg
||| 195.0 kg
||| 187.5 kg
|-bgcolor=#dfefff
|Total||| 357.5 kg
||| 347.5 kg||| 345.0 kg
|-
!colspan=7|90 kg
|-
|Snatch
||| 175.0 kg
||| 172.5 kg
||| 162.5 kg
|-
|Clean & Jerk
||| 212.5 kg
||| 210.0 kg
||| 200.0 kg
|-bgcolor=#dfefff
|Total
||| 385.0 kg||| 385.0 kg
||| 362.5 kg|-
!colspan=7|110 kg
|-
|Snatch
||| 167.5 kg
||| 165.0 kg
||| 162.5 kg
|-
|Clean & Jerk
||| 227.5 kg
||| 220.0 kg
||| 205.0 kg
|-bgcolor=#dfefff
|Total||| 390.0 kg
||| 387.5 kg||| 370.0 kg
|- 
!colspan=7|+110 kg
|-
|Snatch
||| 187.5 kg
||| 175.0 kg
||| 167.5 kg
|-
|Clean & Jerk
||| 235.0 kg
||| 235.0 kg
||| 225.0 kg
|-bgcolor=#dfefff
|Total
||| 422.5 kg||| 402.5 kg
||| 400.0 kg|}

Medal table
Ranking by Big''' (Total result) medals

References
Results (Chidlovski.net)
М. Л. Аптекарь.  «Тяжёлая атлетика. Справочник.» — М.: «Физкультура и спорт», 1983. — 416 с. 

European Weightlifting Championships
European Weightlifting Championships
European Weightlifting Championships
International weightlifting competitions hosted by Italy
Sport in Verona